Jaula de Oro (Spanish for Cage of Gold) is the title of a studio album released by the Mexican norteño group, Los Tigres del Norte, in 1984. It was the first number one on the Billboard Regional Mexican Albums.

Track listing

Critical reception

Wilson Neate of Allmusic gave the album a four of out five praising the title track of the album.

Chart performance

References

1984 albums
Los Tigres del Norte albums
Spanish-language albums
Fonovisa Records albums